Justify may refer to:
 Justify (horse), winner of the 2018 U.S. Thoroughbred Triple Crown (Kentucky Derby, Preakness Stakes, and Belmont Stakes)
 Justify (ANSI), an ANSI escape sequence
 "Justify" (ATB song)
 "Justify" (The Rasmus song)
 "Justify", a song by The Red Jumpsuit Apparatus

See also  
 Justified (disambiguation)
 Justifier (disambiguation)
 Justification (disambiguation)